There have been several military campaigns against the Tunisian city of Mahdia, including:

Mahdia campaign of 1087, in which Genoese and Pisan forces sacked the city
In 1148 the city was sacked (see Kingdom of Africa)
Barbary Crusade (1390), in which French and Genoese crusaders unsuccessfully besieged the city
Capture of Mahdia (1550), in which Spanish forces besieged and captured the city